The Olarian orogeny was a metamorphic and orogenic event in the Gawler Craton of Australia in the Proterozoic. A subduction zone off the coast of proto-Australia and the collision of the Warumpi Province led to metamorphism.

See also
List of orogenies

References

Orogenies of Australia
Proterozoic orogenies